Héctor Ramón Castellón Fernández (born 31 August 1960) is a Honduran former footballer and football manager.

References

1960 births
Living people
People from Cortés Department
Association football midfielders
Honduran footballers
C.D. Olimpia players
C.D. Broncos players
Honduran football managers
F.C. Motagua managers
C.D. Marathón managers
Platense F.C. managers